Ladda caenides is a species of butterfly in the family Hesperiidae. It is found in Venezuela.

References

Butterflies described in 1868
Hesperiidae of South America
Taxa named by William Chapman Hewitson